General Patton vs. The X-Ecutioners is a collaboration album released by Mike Patton and New York City's hip-hop DJ trio The X-Ecutioners. It was released on February 5, 2005 through Ipecac Recordings, and was entirely produced by Mike Patton.

Production
The album was produced over a course of two years. The X-Ecutioners built the album's basic tracks around samples from albums and films suggested by Mike Patton, who finalized the album.

Style
The album's musical style draws from free jazz and glitch. It is themed around a war between the two vastly different musical styles. The album contains various samples from uncredited films, including kung fu movies and Dirty Harry.  One of the larger samples includes dialog from actors John Hillerman and Dennis Olivieri, taken from the soundtrack of the film "The Naked Ape."

Track listing

All lyrics by Mike Patton, published by Mal di Golda (ASCAP).Produced, arranged and mixed at Vulcan Studios, San Francisco, California.Mastered at Oasis Mastering, Los Angeles, California.

Personnel
 Mike Patton - vocals, keyboard, guitar, bass and percussion, editing and programming, production, arrangement, mixing, artwork
 Rob Swift - turntables
 Roc Raida - turntables
 Total Eclipse - turntables
 Gene Grimaldi - mastering
 Martin Kvamme - artwork

References

Ipecac Recordings albums
2005 albums
Mike Patton albums
The X-Ecutioners albums
Collaborative albums